Amjad Ibrahim Didi (born 11 September 1967), commonly known as Amjad Ibrahim is a Maldivian film director and screenwriter.

Early life
After completing eleven years of service in Maldives National Defence Force, Ibrahim decided to pursue a career in film direction due to his "fondness" towards film-making process. His first work as a director was Naifaru Dhohokko's video single "Maslahathu Neiy An'binney", followed by directing six songs for the television program, Maazeege Handhaan. His first television drama, Maaburuge Usoolu was released in 1995 produced by the Maldives National Defence Force.

Career
Amjad Ibrahim wrote and released his debut-direction, a drama film Huras in 1996, which features Hassan Afeef, Mariyam Rasheedha, Vazuna Ahmed, Koyya Hassan Manik and Arifa Ibrahim in pivotal roles. The film which focuses on an immoral relationship between a teacher and a student was developed solely with the intention of winning Gaumee Film Awards though it failed to garner any award at 2nd Gaumee Film Awards ceremony. The following year, he released the commercially successful romantic drama film Loabeega Aniyaa (1997) which appears Mariyam Nisha, an established actress her career for an underprivileged talented vocalist (Hussain Sobah). The film launched Jamsheedha Ahmed as an actress and Ibrahim considers it as one of his "biggest accomplishments" he has achieved in the industry. The next year, Ibrahim made his screen debut in Hamid Ali's drama film Mila Handhuvaru (1998), starred as the grandfather of Mariyam (Mariyam Nisha), a pampered child of a family trapped in a lie.

Ibrahim next launched actor Yoosuf Shafeeu with his comedy drama film Qurbaani (2000) featuring Shafeeu, Mariyam Nisha and Hussain Sobah. The film was a financially successful project and was declared a Mega-Hit at the end of its run at cinema. Post Shafeeu's debut, Ibrahim roped him in several other projects he worked in. The same year, he released Ainbehge Loabi Firiehge Vaajib (2000) starring Yoosuf Shafeeu, Jamsheedha Ahmed, Arifa Ibrahim and Niuma Mohamed. The film revolves around a woman who has been mistreated by her step-mother and forced into a marriage she disapproves.

In 2001, Ibrahim directed Aaah starring Shafeeu, Sheela Najeeb, Jamsheedha Ahmed, Mohamed Shavin and Ibrahim Giyas which revolves around two siblings involved in family business and the downfall of the younger brother's love life when he discovers his fiance is already married to an abusive husband. The following year, he released two films; a horror film Sandhuravirey (2002) which narrates the story of a female jinn aiming to win the heart of a human being and a drama film starring Shafeeu and Sheela Najeeb, Kahvalhah Dhaandhen (2002). Featuring Shafeeu and Mariyam Nisha in lead roles, the former received poor reviews from critics.

This was followed by a series of poorly received horror films. In 2003, he released the romantic horror film Dhonkamana (2003) which depicts the romantic relationship between a young man (Yoosuf Shafeeu) and an old woman (Fauziyya Hassan). Starring additional cast including Sheela Najeeb, Niuma Mohamed, Sheereen Abdul Wahid, Amira Ismail and Aminath Rasheedha, received mainly negative reviews from critics though its inclusion of the theme portraying the relationship between a couple with a large age gap was appraised. The following year, his next directorial venture Sandhuravirey 2 (2004) which was a sequel to his 2002 horror film Sandhuravirey. Marked as the first Maldivian sequel, the cast of the film includes Shafeeu, Niuma Mohamed, Zeenath Abbas, Mohamed Shavin and Sheereen Abdul Wahid. Similar to its prequel, the film received negative response from critics.

In 2009, he again worked in two romantic horror films Udhabaani and Baaraige Fas. The former stars Yoosuf Shafeeu as the boyfriend of a school student (Amira Ismail) who has been harassed by a supernatural force. Upon release, the film received mixed reviews from critics although it performed well at the box office, making it Ibrahim's most successful venture. The latter follows a temptress vampire (Mariyam Nisha) who goes into a killing spree to quench her thirst. The film received mainly negative reviews from critics though he fetched his only Maldives Film Award nomination as the Best Director.

This was followed by a horror film, Mendhamuge Evaguthu (2010) co-written and co-directed by him alongside Yoosuf Shafeeu. It follows a group of ten friends watching a horror film which is being influenced by a narration in it. His next horror film Vakinuvinama (2010) was a critical and commercial failure. This was followed by his family drama Hithey Dheymee (2011) which received negative reviews from critics and was a box office disaster. The same year, his suspense thriller film Hafaraaiy (2011) was released starring Yoosuf Shafeeu, Ali Shameel, Mariyam Shakeela, Amira Ismail and Fathimath Fareela, which was a critical and commercial failure. Based on a real incident, the film narrates a story of a cannibal woman who is addicted to eating human flesh, how she victimised the inhabitants with her face covered in a veil. The film received criticism for its "fragile" plot, "unnecessary" characters though its makeup was appreciated. Ahmed Naif from Sun wrote: "neither scientifically nor psychologically, it has been proven in the film how a chicken addict turns to be a cannibal. The film slides from a suspense thriller to a comedy for its inclusion of inconceivable details".

After the film Hafaraaiy (2011), Ibrahim took a break of eight years before returning to the work of film direction. In 2018, he released another horror film Reyvumun which marks his fifty second direction.

Filmography

Feature films

Short films

Television

Accolades

References

External links

Living people
People from Malé
1967 births
Maldivian film directors